This is a list of players who scored over 100 goals in Primeira Liga, Portugal's top flight football league, during its history starting from the 1934–35 season.

All-time top scorers

Key
 Bold shows players still playing in Primeira Liga.
 Italics show players still playing professional football in other leagues.

See also
Bola de Prata (Portugal)
List of Primeira Liga hat-tricks

References

Portugal